Jamia Naeemia Moradabad is an Islamic seminary in India. It is located in Moradabad in the northern state of Uttar Pradesh. The seminary is a major center of the Barelvi movement in India and has been the target of violence by the rival Deobandi movement.

History
It started off as a madrasa in the town of Moradabad. It was named 'Naeemia' after the name of Naeem-ud-Deen Muradabadi, a Sunni Islamic scholar. It has produced several leading ulemas of Sunni Sufi movement.

In 1925 (1343H), an All India Sunni Conference’s first summit was organised at Jamia Naeemia Moradabad, whose aims included the unification of "the Sunni majority" under a single political, economic, and socio-religious platform. It was  attended by the more than two hundred and fifty religious scholars. 
Sajjada-nashin of Dargah Syed Ashraf Jahangir Semnani, Syed Mohammad Izhar Ashraf taught at Jamia Naeemia Moradabad

Courses
Alim
Fazil
Maulvi

Fatwas
A Fatwa was issued against Samajwadi Party leader Azam Khan for allegedly forcefully snatching land of cemetery grounds and other properties from the poor. Mufti Muhibbey Ali Naeemi, issued Fatwa.

See also
Jamia Nizamia 
Jamiatur Raza
Islam in India
Al-Jame-atul-Islamia
Manzar-e-Islam

Notes

External links
Jamia Naeemia

Islamic universities and colleges in India
Madrasas in India
Barelvi Islamic universities and colleges
Moradabad